Arthur Wergs Mitchell, Sr. (December 22, 1883 – May 9, 1968), was a U.S. Representative from Illinois. For his entire congressional career from 1935 to 1943, he was the only African American in Congress. Mitchell was the first African American to be elected to the United States Congress as a Democrat—he defeated and succeeded Oscar De Priest, a black Republican.

Early life
Mitchell was born to Taylor Mitchell and Emma (Patterson) in Lafayette, Alabama. He left home at 14 to go to the Tuskegee Institute. He worked on a farm and as an office boy to Booker T. Washington while attending the Institute. Mitchell attended Columbia University briefly and qualified for the bar. He then moved to Chicago, Illinois and began to work for the Republican Party. Mitchell switched from the Republican Party to the Democratic Party in 1932 as he was “ambitious and impatient with the entrenched black Republican leadership, [seeking] a chance for personal advancement in the concurrent rise of the national Democratic party." He was a member of Phi Beta Sigma fraternity and served as its 6th International President from 1926–1934.

Political career
Mitchell was elected to the House of Representatives in 1934, defeating African American congressman Oscar De Priest, who was a Republican. During the election campaign, Mitchell emphasized his support for the New Deal and President Franklin D. Roosevelt's public relief programs, in addition to criticizing De Priest's opposition to segregation as ineffective. After Mitchell won the election with 53% of the vote, De Priest told him "I congratulate you as [the] first Negro Democratic congressman."

In Congress, Mitchell introduced bills banning lynching and against discrimination. He filed a lawsuit against the Illinois Central and Rock Island Railroads after he was forced into a segregated train car just before it passed into Arkansas. Mitchell's suit was advanced to the U.S. Supreme Court as case Mitchell v. United States, which ruled that the railroad violated the Interstate Commerce Act. He voluntarily chose not to seek re-election in 1942. As his last congressional act, Mitchell condemned politicians as preferring the Axis powers over giving Negros any rights, comparing the atrocities of the Nazis and Japanese with lynchings such as those that had recently occurred in Shubuta, Mississippi.

Despite having been elected to Congress in part on campaigning against De Priest's civil rights record as weak, Mitchell himself faced accusations by civil rights advocates of making insufficient efforts. In one instance, the National Association for the Advancement of Colored People deemed his introduced anti-lynching bill as too lenient.

After Congress
He moved to Virginia and became a farmer, working twelve acres (49,000 m²) of property.  He died at his home in Petersburg, Virginia, on May 9, 1968.

Electoral history

See also

 List of African-American firsts
 List of African-American United States representatives
 List of Phi Beta Sigma brothers

References

External sources

 
 O'Connor, Allison (November 14, 2007). Arthur Wergs Mitchell (1883–1968). BlackPast.

Further reading
 
 
 

African-American members of the United States House of Representatives
African-American people in Illinois politics
Activists for African-American civil rights
American anti-lynching activists
Politicians from Chicago
1883 births
1968 deaths
People from LaFayette, Alabama
Politicians from Petersburg, Virginia
Illinois Republicans
Democratic Party members of the United States House of Representatives from Illinois
Columbia University alumni
20th-century American politicians
20th-century African-American politicians
African-American men in politics